Syme Home Video was a Melbourne-based film distributor in the late 1970s to mid-1980s. It was also the first distributor of Walt Disney Home Video titles in the early 1980s, before Roadshow Home Video took over.

Filmography
 1976: Deathcheaters
 1977: Journey Among Women
 1980: Touch and Go
 1980: Manganinnie
 1980: Final Cut
 1980: Fatty Finn
 1981: Doctors & Nurses
 1982: The Plains of Heaven
 1982: Duet for Four
 1982: Brothers
 1982: Remembrance of Love
 1983: 10 to Midnight
 1983: Sahara
 1984: Exterminator 2